Andreas Kristoffer Jungdal (born 22 February 2002) is a Danish professional footballer who plays as a goalkeeper for Austrian Bundesliga club Rheindorf Altach, on loan from AC Milan. Born in Singapore, he is a Denmark youth international.

Career
Jungdal was born in Singapore, where his father was stationed for The Lego Group. His family returned to Denmark, and he started playing football as a five-year-old for Skibet IF in Vejle, before joining the town's main club Vejle Boldklub in 2013.

On 16 July 2019, Jungdal joined the youth academy of Italian Serie A club AC Milan. He was part of the first team for the first time on 26 October 2020 as an unused substitute in a 3–3 home draw against Roma in Serie A. On 18 October 2021, he extended his contract with Milan until 2024. In late 2021, he was sidelined with a disease in his kidneys, but made a full recovery in early 2022.

In 10 January 2023, he joined Austrian Bundesliga club Rheindorf Altach on a six-month loan until the end of the season, with an option to be signed permanently.

Style of play
Jungdal has been described as an "explosive" goalkeeper with good ability to play out from the back. He has been compared to Mike Maignan in playing style by media.

Honours
AC Milan
 Serie A: 2021–22

References

External links
 

Living people
2002 births
Danish men's footballers
Denmark youth international footballers
Denmark under-21 international footballers
Singaporean footballers
Singaporean people of Danish descent
Association football goalkeepers
A.C. Milan players
SC Rheindorf Altach players
Danish expatriate men's footballers
Danish expatriate sportspeople in Italy
Expatriate footballers in Italy
Danish expatriate sportspeople in Austria
Expatriate footballers in Austria